Simón Bolívar Canton is a canton of Ecuador, located in the Guayas Province.  Its capital is the town of Simón Bolívar.  Its population at the 2001 census was 20,385.

Demographics
Ethnic groups as of the Ecuadorian census of 2010:
Mestizo  67.9%
Montubio  20.9%
Afro-Ecuadorian  6.3%
White  4.4%
Indigenous  0.4%
Other  0.2%

References

Cantons of Guayas Province